Koravit Namwiset, simply known as Tui, is a Thai retired professional footballer who plays as a centre-back; he has also been used as a left-back.

International

In May 2015, he played for Thailand in the 2018 FIFA World Cup qualification (AFC) against Vietnam.

International

Honours

Club
Buriram United
 Thai League 1 (2): 2015, 2017
 Thai FA Cup (1): 2015
 Thai League Cup (1): 2015
 Kor Royal Cup (1): 2015
 Mekong Club Championship (2): 2015, 2016

International
Thailand University 
 ASEAN University Games  Gold Medal (1); 2012

Thailand
 ASEAN Football Championship (1): 2016

References

External links

Living people
1986 births
Koravit Namwiset
Koravit Namwiset
Association football defenders
Koravit Namwiset
Koravit Namwiset
Koravit Namwiset
Koravit Namwiset
Koravit Namwiset
Koravit Namwiset